Hot Telecommunication Systems Ltd. is a company that provides cable television, last-mile Internet access, broadband and telecommunication services in Israel. It also provides various data transmission services and network services at different rates, services to the business sector and other ancillary services.

In November 2004, Hot Telecom commenced providing domestic fixed line telephone services to residential and business subscribers. The company’s shares were traded on the Tel Aviv Stock Exchange and was a constitute of the TA-100 Index until its acquisition by Altice. In March 2013, the company employed 3,958 workers.

History

The company was founded on 18 August 2003 as union of the three national cable companies in Israel: Matav, Tevel and Golden Channels that can be directly linked to the growing competition of the local satellite television provider Yes. While these companies had pursued a union since the late 1990s in order to save administrative and content purchasing costs, and especially after Yes was founded in order to stop it before it could grow, the Israeli government monopoly regulator had denied it until the time when Yes had grown at least a minimum subscriber base. The three original companies had not competed with each other since each had been regulated with specific cities and regions.

Hot offers about 200 local and foreign-language channels in its digital television services. Hot also offers several exclusive channels under the Hot brand name. In addition to the digital television services, Hot still provides an analog television service, despite plans to abandon it by 2012, but it has already disconnected the analog service in many areas including central Israel, in favor of digital signals. Many HOT subscribers must now have a decoder box to view broadcasts.

Not long after it was created, Hot began offering local telecom service using VoIP, a voice-over-internet technology and internet access services as well. Hot is not an Internet service provider and is only permitted to offer last mile access. , Hot had about 950,000 customers; 60% using the digital television services, over 400,000 using the internet services and over 100,000 using the phone services.

As of late 2005, Hot offered a wide VOD service, offering content from almost all channels and content that is not broadcast by other companies.

In 2009, businessman Patrick Drahi increased his stake in the company. Drahi completed the takeover in 2011, and offered to buy remaining shares in 2012. As a result, Hot is a part of Drahi's company, Altice Europe NV, as of 2018.

In December 2010, Hot received a license to operate an Internet service provider in the form of a subsidiary. In February 2021, Israel's Ministry of Communications approved Hot's NIS 170 million investment in the fiber-optic infrastructure venture IBC, subject to a number of antitrust conditions.

In 2018, Hot started broadcasting the Kan11 channel at 4K resolution for the first time at channel 511.

Criticism
Hot has been criticized for refusing to provide service to certain areas of Israel, despite being bound by contract to do so. Regions especially lacking are those that are predominantly Haredi and Arab-Israeli, as well as the Arava. Hot responded that it already provided service for 95–98% of the country, and sought an official exemption from providing them to certain areas, where the decision lies with the Communications Ministry.

Customer service

Hot has been accused of using extortionist tactics in its customer service, including refusal to log customer requests to cancel service, and sending repeated bills after termination of service. Hot has been accused of racketeering and faces multiple class action suits.

Hot also used to be well known for the longest waiting times for customer service in Israel, they have been forced to reduce await times from hours to 3 minutes, and have the option for a callback.

Involvement in Israeli settlements

On 12 February 2020, the United Nations published a database of companies doing business related in the West Bank, including East Jerusalem, as well as in the occupied Golan Heights. Hot Telecom was listed on the database on account of its activities in Israeli settlements in these occupied territories, which the UN considers illegal under international law.

See also 
 HOT3 - The main channel of Hot, which airs US shows, as well as original Israeli shows.
 Yes (Israel) - the competing satellite television provider.
 List of mobile network operators of Israel

References

External links 
 
Hot TV Guide 
Cable Internet – support site 
Hot Customer Service 
Hot Customer Service stories
List of Hot channels

 
Altice (company)
Cable and DBS companies of Israel
Telecommunications companies of Israel
Israeli brands
Internet service providers of Israel